Marble Arms & Manufacturing Company of Gladstone, Michigan began in 1892 with the invention and manufacture of the Marble Universal Rifle Sight by Webster L. Marble. Frank H. Van Cleve of Escanaba, Michigan shared patent rights on some of the early patents applied for by Webster L. Marble.  Products expanded to include outdoor goods like a novel safety axe, hunting knives, match safes, compasses and the Marble Game Getter combination gun. The company grew to be a foremost manufacturer of gun sights, competing with rivals such as Lyman, Redfield, Pacific, King, and Williams gun sight companies.  Still in business in Gladstone, Michigan, Marble Arms remains an important member of the firearm and shooting sports industry.

List of Patents 
 Design for a Compass Card
 Design for a Blade for a Hunting Knife
 Adjustable Gun-sight
 Front Sight for Fire Arms
 Safety Guard for Axes
 Tool Handle Fastening
 Match-Box
 Gaff Hook
 Hunting Knife
 Gun Sight
 Cleaning Rod for Firearms
 Axe-edge Protector
 Pivoted Nail Claw for Axes
 Front Sight
 Compound Tool
 Rear Sight
 Firearm
 Folding Stock for Firearms
 Hammer for Double-Barreled Guns
 Means for Attaching Supplemental Barrels to Firearms
 Supplemental Barrel for Magazine Firearms
 Gaff-Tongs
 Folding Compound Tool
 Front Sight for Firearms
 Slide-Action Firearm
 Detachable and Interchangeable Butt-Piece for Firearms
 Recoil Pad for Firearms

References

External links

Marble Arms Company website

Firearm manufacturers of the United States
Knife manufacturing companies
Firearm sights
Manufacturing companies based in Michigan
American companies established in 1892
1892 establishments in Michigan